Chandler Great (born August 9, 1994), professionally known as Turbo, is an American record producer and songwriter. He is best known for his production with Young Thug, Travis Scott, Gunna, Nav, and Lil Baby.

He executive produced Gunna's debut studio album Drip or Drown 2 with fellow record producer Wheezy. The album premiered at No. 1 on the Billboard Top R&B/Hip-Hop Albums chart.

Career 
In 2017, Turbo produced several songs on We Want Smoke, a compilation album by artists signed to T.I.'s Grand Hustle Records. He executive produced Drip Harder, a collaborative mixtape by Gunna and Lil Baby released in 2018, and is the solo producer on four songs of the mixtape, including "Never Recover" and "Close Friends" which were certified Platinum and "Drip Too Hard" which was certified Diamond. He also produced "Slimed In" on Young Thug's compilation album Slime Language, released in 2018. That same year, he produced on Gunna's third mixtape Drip Season 3. He also founded own his record production collective, The Playmakers.

In June 2019, he signed a co-publishing deal with Warner/Chappell Music. In 2020, he released Quarantine Clean with Young Thug and Gunna, which makes it the first song where Turbo is credited as lead artist.

Production discography

Charted singles

Other charted songs

Production credits

References 

Living people
American hip hop record producers
Southern hip hop musicians
Musicians from Atlanta
African-American record producers
1994 births
21st-century African-American people